The Stepenitz is a right-hand tributary of the Trave in the northwest of the German state of Mecklenburg-Vorpommern and within the borough of Lübeck in the state of Schleswig-Holstein.

Course 

Continuing to head northwest, it collects the River Radegast in Börzow and the Maurine  before Dassow. The river section from Rüting to Dassow has numerous meanders.

Through this lake its waters reach the Pötenitzer Wiek, a bay of the Trave river, the Priwall Peninsula and Mecklenburg, where the Stepenitz discharges into the Trave at sea level. A few hundred metres further north, by Travemünde, the Trave reaches the Baltic.

Watersheds 
While the Stepenitz flows in a northwesterly direction via the Trave to the Baltic, the waters of the Sude, which rises just a few kilometres further southwest and heads in a southwesterly direction, run via the River Elbe to the North Sea.

Gallery

See also
List of rivers of Mecklenburg-Vorpommern
List of rivers of Schleswig-Holstein

References

External links

 Stepenitz and Maurine Lowlands

Rivers of Mecklenburg-Western Pomerania
Rivers of Schleswig-Holstein
Rivers of Germany